Fallen Age is a cancelled massively multiplayer online role-playing game from Netamin. Netamin described the game as a Science Fiction Fantasy hybrid.

Plot
The game took place at approximately 6400 A.D. at a strange new earth.

Development
The game was announced in February 2001. The title was in development for two years with 15 members working on Fallen Age at Netamin, and 50 individuals at their partner SK Corp. 

The game was scheduled to release in Q4 2001. It was put on indefinite hold in July 2001. Netamin cited creative differences with their partners in Korea as reasons why the game was cancelled.

References

Cancelled Windows games
Massively multiplayer online games
Science fiction video games